Patricia Garduño Morales (born 25 November 1960) is a Mexican politician affiliated with the National Action Party. As of 2014 she served as Deputy of the LVI and LIX Legislatures of the Mexican Congress as a plurinominal representative.

References

1960 births
Living people
People from Mexico City
Women members of the Chamber of Deputies (Mexico)
Members of the Chamber of Deputies (Mexico)
National Action Party (Mexico) politicians
Deputies of the LIX Legislature of Mexico